Watch the Red is the sixth studio album by Australian hard rock band The Angels. It was released in May 1983.
The album charted at number 6 in Australia and number 43 in New Zealand.

In June 2002, Shock Records issued The Complete Sessions 1980 - 1983. The 4-CD box set included remasters of Dark Room (9 bonus tracks), Night Attack (9 bonus tracks), Watch The Red (5 bonus tracks) and The Blow (2-CD set of material from a 40-minute jam-session which formed the basis of Watch the Red). In June 2006, Liberation Music re-issued Dark Room from The Complete Sessions 1980 - 1983.

Track listings
Credits adapted from the original releases.

Personnel
The Angels
 Doc Neeson – lead vocals
 Rick Brewster – lead guitar, piano, accordion 	 
 John Brewster – rhythm guitar, lead vocals on "No Sleep in Hell"
 Jim Hilbun – bass guitar, vocals, saxophone, organ, piano
 Brent Eccles – drums

Production
Andrew Scott – producer, engineer, mixing
Al Wright – engineer
Otto Ruiter – mastering

Chart positions

Certifications

References

1983 albums
The Angels (Australian band) albums
Epic Records albums